Lancaster County School District is a school district headquartered in Lancaster, South Carolina. It serves Lancaster County.

Schools

 High schools
 Buford High School
 Indian Land High School
 Andrew Jackson High School
 Lancaster High School
 Lancaster County Career Center

 Middle schools
 A.R. Rucker Middle School
 Buford Middle School
 Indian Land Middle School
 Andrew Jackson Middle School
 South Middle School

 Elementary schools
 Brooklyn Springs Elementary School
 Buford Elementary School
 Clinton Elementary School
 Discovery School/GT
 Erwin Elementary School
 Harrisburg Elementary School
 Heath Springs Elementary School
 Indian Land Elementary School
 Kershaw Elementary School
 McDonald Green Elementary School
 North Elementary School
 Van Wyck Elementary School

 Preschool
 Southside Early Childhood Center

 Other
 Adult Education
 Barr Street Learning Center

References

External links
 
School districts in South Carolina
Education in Lancaster County, South Carolina